The Battle of Listenhoff was fought during the Polish–Swedish War (1621–1625), between Polish–Lithuanian Commonwealth and the Swedish Empire on October 12, 1625. Polish-Lithuanian Commonwealth forces under the command of Aleksander Gosiewski defeated the Swedish forces commanded by Gustav Horn.

References

Compendium Diariussu Expeditiej Jego Mci Pana Hetmana Wielkiego Litewskiego do Inflant w roku 1625

Listenhoff 1625
Listenhoff 1625
Listenhoff 1625
Listenhoff
1625 in Europe
Military history of Latvia